Molly Glynn (June 14, 1968 – September 6, 2014) was an American actress: She was a well-known Chicago stage actress, and also played several roles in film and television, including a recurring role on the television series Chicago Fire.

Glynn, the youngest of five children, grew up as part of a prominent family in Hartford, Connecticut. She graduated from Tufts University, and spoke several languages.

Glynn died from injuries from a falling tree in September 2014.  She and her husband Joe Foust were bicycling on the North Branch Trail in Erickson Woods, suburban Chicago, on September 5 when a sudden storm swept through; wind gusts in the area were over  70 miles per hour (110 km/h).  The tree fell on them just as they were about to take shelter.  Foust was not significantly injured, but Glynn died of her injuries on September 6 at a hospital in Evanston, Illinois. By September 8, a GiveForward.com memorial fund had collected $135,000.

At the time of her death, both her sons, from a previous marriage, were teenagers.

Filmography
Early Edition (1998) (as Molly Glynn Hammond)
No Sleep 'til Madison (2002) (as Molly Glynn Hammond)
In America (2002)
Last Day (2002)
Low Note (2007)
Something Better Somewhere Else (2010) 
Boss (TV series) (2012)
Ctrl + Life + Delete (2013)
Chicago Fire (TV series) (2013)

References

External links 
 

1968 births
2014 deaths
Accidental deaths in Illinois
Actresses from Chicago
American television actresses
American stage actresses
Actresses from Hartford, Connecticut
Place of birth missing
Tufts University alumni
20th-century American actresses
21st-century American actresses